Pyramid Peak is a mountain in the California's Sierra Nevada in the Crystal Range to the west of Lake Tahoe. It is the highest point in the Desolation Wilderness. With an elevation gain of almost , the Rocky Canyon route is the mountain's most popular approach although it is very arduous. To the east, at the base of the peak, lies Pyramid Lake.

References

External links 
 
 
 Alpine Ski Tours - Lake Tahoe: Southwest Topographic Map

Mountains of the Desolation Wilderness
North American 3000 m summits
Mountains of El Dorado County, California